The Seed is Mine: The Life of Kas Maine, a South African Sharecropper 1894-1985 is a microhistorical study by Charles van Onselen. It is a profound social history of an African peasant sharecropper and his family in a racially divided South Africa. Van Onselen paints a stark picture of the relationship between landowner and farmer and its development in an increasingly racist society.

Sources 

 Current History Review
 New York Times Review

1996 non-fiction books
Books about apartheid
South African non-fiction books
History books about South Africa